François Timoléon, abbé de Choisy (16 August 1644 – 2 October 1724) was a French cross-dresser, abbé, and author. He wrote numerous works on church history as well as travelogues, memoirs and fiction.

Biography
De Choisy was born in Paris. His father was attached to the household of the duke of Orléans, whilst his mother, who was on intimate terms with Anne of Austria, was regularly called upon to amuse Louis XIV. By a whim of his mother, the boy was dressed like a girl until he was eighteen, and, after appearing for a short time in man's costume, he resumed woman's dress on the advice—perhaps satirical or tongue-in-cheek advice—of Madame de La Fayette. Upon his mother's death, he inherited a large sum of money, allowing him to live a life of leisure. De Choisy delighted in the most extravagant toilettes until being publicly rebuked by the duc de Montausier, causing his retirement for some time to the provinces; thereupon, he allegedly used female appearance to serve numerous intrigues. However, doubt has been cast upon the veracity of these allegations, with historian Paul Scott of the University of Kansas stating "if you regard it [the memoir] with any scrutiny, there are implausibilities, contradictions, anachronisms and no contemporary corroboration whatsoever."

De Choisy was made an abbé in his childhood, and poverty, induced by extravagance, drove him to live on his benefice at Sainte-Seine in Burgundy, where a kindred spirit was found amongst his neighbours in Bussy-Rabutin. De Choisy visited Rome in the retinue of the cardinal de Bouillon in 1676, and shortly afterwards a serious illness brought about a sudden conversion to genuine religion.

In 1685, he accompanied the Chevalier de Chaumont on a mission to Siam. He was ordained a priest, and received various ecclesiastical preferments, such as the priory of Saint-Benoît-du-Sault in 1689. He was admitted to the Académie française on 24 July 1687.

Works
De Choisy wrote a number of historical and religious works, of which the most notable are the following:
Quatre dialogues sur l'immortalité de l'âme ... (1684), written with the Abbé Dangeau and explaining their conversion.
Histoire de l'Eglise (11 vols., 1703–1723)
De Choisy is remembered for his gossiping Mémoires (1737), which contains detailed portraits of his contemporaries, although there is some question about its historical accuracy.

The Mémoires passed through many editions, and were edited in 1868 by M. de Lescure. Some admirable letters of de Choisy are included in the correspondence of Bussy-Rabutin. De Choisy is said to have burnt some of their indiscreet revelations, but left a considerable quantity of unpublished manuscripts. Part of this material was surreptitiously used in an anonymous Histoire de madame la comtesse de Barres (Antwerp, 1735) and again with much editing in the Vie de M. l'abbé de Choisy (Lausanne and Geneva, 1742), ascribed by Paul Lacroix to Lenglet Dufresnoy; the text was finally edited (1870) by Lacroix as Aventures de l'abbé de Choisy. See also Sainte-Beuve, Causeries du lundi, vol. iii.

Influences
The Scottish philosopher David Hume (1711–1776) had de Choisy's Mémoires and account of Siam in his library.

References

External links
Famous Trannies in Early Modern Times

1644 births
1724 deaths
Members of the Académie Française
18th-century French historians
French memoirists
French male non-fiction writers
17th-century French LGBT people
French LGBT writers
Male-to-female cross-dressers
18th-century memoirists